The 11th constituency of the Pas-de-Calais is a French legislative constituency in the Pas-de-Calais département. It elects one député to the National Assembly. It has been represented by Marine Le Pen since 2017.

Description

For the 2012 French legislative election, the constituency attracted nationwide and international attention, as for the first time two candidates from the 2012 French presidential election stood as candidates there: Marine Le Pen of the National Front and Jean-Luc Mélenchon of the Left Front. Since 2007, Le Pen had been an opposition member of the Socialist Party-held town council in Hénin-Beaumont, the largest town in the constituency, while Mélenchon had argued that the Pas-de-Calais is "the birthplace of the workers' movement in France and should not be abandoned to the far-right". Opinion polls a month before the election suggested Le Pen would finish first in the first round, during which the political left was divided between several parties, but she would be beaten by Kemel or Mélenchon in the second round, with the Left Front potentially taking the constituency from the locally embattled Socialists. The Le Pen–Mélenchon duel attracted international media attention, including for what it revealed of attitudes and expectations in an area of northern France hit hard by deindustrialisation and unemployment. The Guardian wrote that, in that regard, "Mélenchon blames what he sees as pernicious free-market capitalism and bankers; Le Pen points the finger at immigrants and Europe".

Previous office-holders
The seat had traditionally been held by the French Left until 2017. In 1988, Socialist candidate Noël Josèphe had been the only candidate in the second round, which he won unopposed. In 1993, the seat went to the French Communist Party member Rémy Auchedé; Marcel Cabiddu, who was unopposed in the second round, took it back for the Socialists in 1997; he was re-elected in 2002. Upon his death in 2004, the seat went to his suppléante Odette Duriez, who then won the 2007 election.

Election results

2022 
 
 
 
 
 
|-
| colspan="8" bgcolor="#E9E9E9"|
|-

2017
Philippe Kemel of the Socialist Party, the incumbent deputy, was defeated in the first round. This left only Marine Le Pen, who finished second by less than half a percentage point in the 2012 election, and Anne Roquet of President Emmanuel Macron's recently created En Marche! party. Jean-Luc Mélenchon, who came in third in the first round of the 2012 election, did not run, instead opting to run for a seat in Bouches-du-Rhône's 4th constituency. He was replaced by Jean-Pierre Carpentier of La France insoumise, a party founded by Mélenchon, and finished in fourth place.

2012
The Union for a Popular Movement did not present a candidate of its own, and instead endorsed as candidate a member of the Democratic Movement, Jean Urbaniak. Urbaniak officially stood as an independent candidate of the centre-right.

A debate was organised between the five main candidates (Kemel, Le Pen, Mélenchon, Tondelier, and Urbaniak) on the regional edition of the France 3 television channel.

2007

2002
Two candidates stood under the Communist label, including former MP Rémy Auchedé (by now a dissident), but neither was endorsed by the French Communist Party.

1997

 
 
 
 
 
 
 
 

 
 
 
 
* Withdrew before the second round

References

Further reading